Ying Hon Ronald Yeung (born 30 July 1988) is a Hong Kong former professional cyclist, who rode professionally between 2014 and 2017.

Major results

2008
 9th Road race, Asian Road Championships
2009
 3rd  Road race, East Asian Games
2010
 1st Stage 1 Tour de Korea
 4th Tour of South China Sea
 10th Overall Tour of Japan
2011
 2nd Road race, National Road Championships
 2nd Overall Tour de East Java
1st Stage 2
 8th Overall Tour de Kumano
 8th Overall Tour de Indonesia
1st Stage 3
2012
 1st Stage 1 Tour de East Java
 4th Tour de Okinawa
 8th Overall Tour of Fuzhou
 9th Overall Tour de Ijen
2013
 5th Road race, Asian Road Championships
2014
 1st Stage 1 Tour International de Sétif
 2nd Road race, National Road Championships
 2nd Circuit d'Alger
 3rd Overall Tour d'Algérie
 5th Critérium International de Sétif
2015
 1st Stage 4 Tour of Thailand
2016
 1st Stage 3 Tour de Flores
2017
 3rd Time trial, National Road Championships

References

External links

1988 births
Living people
Hong Kong male cyclists